Leodonta is a Neotropical genus of butterflies in the family Pieridae.

Species
Leodonta dysoni (Doubleday, 1847)
Leodonta tagaste (Felder, C & R Felder, 1859)
Leodonta tellane (Hewitson, 1860)
Leodonta zenobia (Felder, C & R Felder, 1865)
Leodonta zenobina (Hopffer, 1869)

References

Pierini
Pieridae of South America
Pieridae genera
Taxa named by Arthur Gardiner Butler